Christopher John Foreman (born 8 August 1956), nicknamed Chrissy Boy, is an English musician, singer-songwriter, and composer. In a career spanning more than 40 years, Foreman came to prominence in the late 1970s as the guitarist for the English band Madness.

Early life
Christopher John Foreman was born on 8 August 1956, in St Pancras, London, England. His father John Foreman, known on the folk-scene as a music hall revivalist, attempted to teach him to play guitar as a child, but he could not maintain an interest. Foreman bought a cheap second-hand guitar when he was 20 and became more enthusiastic about the instrument when he began to learn chords. He then acquired a Fender Telecaster which he used whilst recording Madness' debut album.

Career

Foreman formed Madness with keyboardist Mike Barson and saxophonist Lee Thompson in 1976. Foreman was one of the group's main songwriters, mostly writing music with other members, usually Suggs or Lee Thompson, providing the lyrics.

After Madness disbanded in 1986, he formed a new band The Madness with Thompson, Suggs and Chas Smash, but they broke up after releasing their debut album, the eponymous The Madness. Then Foreman, alongside Thompson, created another group called The Nutty Boys with Thompson on lead vocals. They released an album called Crunch! in 1990. The band continued to be known as Crunch!, and played in London every couple of years.

Foreman reunited with all seven original Madness members in 1992. In 2005 Foreman announced that he was leaving the band, but on 30 November 2006, it was confirmed that Foreman was returning to play on Madness' forthcoming UK Christmas tour.

In 2006, Foreman began using a Samsung D600 mobile phone attached to his guitar to record short videos from his position on stage during live Madness performances to provide his fans with a unique perspective from the "guitar's eye view". He coined the term "Axecam" to describe this filming technique. By December 2008, he had acquired a higher quality digital Flip video camera which he attached to the shoulder strap of his guitar using an "Axecam holder", crafted by a member of the stage crew just before Madness went on stage at The O2 Arena on 19 December 2008. The new "Axecam" produced a far more stable picture and Foreman posted the first video from this performance ("It Must Be Love") to the MadnessStudio2008 Channel on YouTube on 20 December 2008.

Chrissy Boy Meets And Greets...
Foreman also maintains a series of videos made with the Axecam entitled "Chrissy Boy Meets And Greets...", in which he meets famous people that have either appeared alongside Madness at festivals, or that have attended awards ceremonies with Madness. The video is normally a close up of the famous person's face, with Foreman out of shot, and usually consists of a few spoken words, and perhaps a joke or humorous reference from Foreman to the star's career. Each clip is normally less than ten seconds long. Stars featured have included: Dizzee Rascal, Al Murray, Plan B, Alex James, Graham Coxon and Damon Albarn, former Madness singer/drummer/manager John Hasler, all six members of the reformed Specials, ex-Bodysnatcher and Madness collaborator Rhoda Dakar, Martin Freeman, Eamonn Holmes, Jeremy Clarkson, Lulu, and Peter Andre, as well as an Elvis Presley lookalike security guard from Australia.

Personal life
In 1976 Foreman married Susan, his childhood sweetheart, and they have a son, Matthew (born 1976). In 1992 Foreman married his second wife Laurence, and they have a son, Felix (born 1993, Hampstead, London). In 2001 Foreman married his third wife Melissa, and they have a son Frankie Foreman (born 2002, London) and a daughter, Elfie (born 2006, Brighton)

In 2006 Foreman moved out of his Kentish Town home, settling in Brighton.

References

External links
 Myspace.com
 Crunch.uk.com
 Madness.co.uk

1956 births
Living people
English rock guitarists
English pop guitarists
English male guitarists
English songwriters
Lead guitarists
Madness (band) members
People from Camden Town
Musicians from London
British ska musicians